Harry Crider (born May 18, 1999) is an American football guard who is a free agent. He played college football at Indiana.

Early life and education
Harry Crider was born on May 18, 1999, in Columbus, Indiana. He attended Columbus East High School before playing college football at Indiana. He played football, basketball, baseball, and wrestled in high school, earning three letters. He gained numerous honors after his senior season, including: Indiana Football Coaches Association Top 50, Indiana all-state, Indiana Associated Press 6A all-state, Indianapolis Star position award winner (offensive line), USA Today All-USA Indiana team, 2015 IFCA all-state, and team captain. At Indiana, he appeared in 8 games during his freshman year, and 6 in his sophomore year. Crider was named a Big Ten Distinguished Scholar and Academic All-Big Ten selection following his sophomore year. He gained a starting role in his junior year, starting all 13 games (12 at left guard, 1 at center). In his senior season, he started all 8 games at center, and was named honorable mention all–Big 10. He chose to forgo remaining eligibility and instead declare for the 2021 NFL Draft.

Professional career

Philadelphia Eagles
After going unselected in the 2021 NFL Draft, Crider signed as an undrafted free agent with the Philadelphia Eagles. He was waived on August 23, 2021. He was signed to the practice squad on September 14. He was released by the Eagles on September 21, 2021.

Denver Broncos
On September 29, 2021, Crider was signed to the Denver Broncos practice squad. He was released on October 5.

References

External links
Philadelphia Eagles profile

1999 births
Living people
People from Columbus, Indiana
Players of American football from Indiana
American football offensive linemen
Indiana Hoosiers football players
Philadelphia Eagles players
Denver Broncos players